Quannum Projects (also known as Quannum MCs) is an American hip hop collective based in the San Francisco Bay Area. It has been active since 1992, when it was formed at UC Davis under the moniker Solesides Records. It is also the name of the independent record label that releases their records, as well as those of a number of other artists. The label continues to be 100% independently owned and operated.

Artist roster
 Apsci (Dana Diaz-Tutaan & Raphael LaMotta – Brooklyn, New York)
 Blackalicious (Gift of Gab & Chief Xcel – Sacramento, California)
 Curumin (Luciano Nakata Albuquerque – Brazil)
 General Elektriks (Hervé Salters – Paris, France)
 Tommy Guerrero (San Francisco, California)
 Honeycut (San Francisco, California)
 Lateef and the Chief a.k.a. Maroons (Lateef & Chief Xcel – Oakland, California)
 Latyrx (Lateef & Lyrics Born – Oakland, California)
 Lifesavas (Jumbo, Vursatyl, Rev. Shines – Portland, Oregon)
 Lyrics Born (Berkeley, California)
 Pieces of Peace (Chicago, Illinois)
 Pigeon John (Hawthorne, California)
 Poets of Rhythm (Whitefield Brothers & Boris Borale – Munich, Germany)
 DJ Shadow (Joshua Davis – Mill Valley, California)
 Joyo Velarde (Berkeley, California)

See also
 List of record labels
 Underground hip hop

External links
 SoleSides website
 Archived official website
 SF Weekly article on Quannum Projects

 
American independent record labels
Hip hop record labels
Hip hop collectives
Record labels established in 1992